Marvin Grumann (born 23 June 1993) is a German professional footballer who plays as an attacking midfielder for SV Schermbeck.

External links 
 

1993 births
People from Borken, North Rhine-Westphalia
Sportspeople from Münster (region)
Footballers from North Rhine-Westphalia
Living people
German footballers
Association football midfielders
Rot-Weiß Oberhausen players
FC Kray players
SSVg Velbert players
SV Schermbeck players
3. Liga players
Regionalliga players
Oberliga (football) players